The South Asia Research is  international, multidisciplinary forum which covers the history, politics, law, economics, sociology, visual culture, languages and literature of the countries in South Asia.

The journal is published three times a year by SAGE Publications (New Delhi) and includes works of theory, review and synthesis as well as detailed empirical studies by both research students and established scholars around the world.

This journal is a member of the Committee on Publication Ethics (COPE).

Abstracting and indexing 
South Asia Research is abstracted and indexed in:
 ProQuest: International Bibliography of the Social Sciences (IBSS)
 SCOPUS
 DeepDyve
 Portico
 Dutch-KB
 Pro-Quest-RSP
 EBSCO
 OCLC
 Ohio
 ICI
 ProQuest-Illustrata
 Sociological Abstracts - ProQuest
 Worldwide Political Science Abstracts - ProQuest
 PAIS International - ProQuest
 Thomson Reuters: Emerging Sources Citation Index (ESCI)
 Bibliography of Asian Studies (BAS)
 J-Gate

References 

 http://publicationethics.org/members/south-asia-research=COPE

External links 
 
 Homepage

SAGE Publishing academic journals
Publications established in 1998
South Asia